The Nokia 3720 classic is a mobile phone by Nokia announced in July 2009 and manufactured in Hungary. The phone runs the Series 40 6th edition platform. 

This phone is IP54 rated against water, dust and is also shock proof. This makes the phone Nokia's first IP certified device. Nokia has released videos showing how rugged this device is such as being placed under water, kicked by a rugby boot and hit by a golf club.

Technical specifications

 Series 40 6th Edition
 J2ME (Java ME) MIDP 2.0 MIDlets (apps) support
 IEC 60529/Level IP54 certified to be water and dust resistant
 Tri-band GSM / GPRS / EDGE: GSM 900 / 1800 / 1900
 96 MB memory  (NAND and SDRAM) with a total of 20 MB for user storage
 2.0-megapixel (1600×1200) camera
 Bluetooth 2.1
 USB 2.0 (microUSB)
 microSD expandable up to 8GB
 Music player supporting AAC, AAC+, AMR, eAAC+, MIDI, Mobile XMF, MP3, MP4, WAV and WMA
 LED Torch

See also
IP Code
MIL-STD-810
Rugged computer

References

External links

Nokia 3720 classic Data Sheet 
Nokia Conversations – Can we break it? 
Nokia Conversations – Just how rugged is a rugged device? 
Nokia Conversations – Nokia 3720 unveiled - specs and photos 
Nokia 3720 classic stress test

3720